Lisa Hartman Black (born June 1, 1956) is an American actress and singer.

Career
After some minor television appearances, Hartman starred on the short-lived Bewitched spin-off, Tabitha during 1977–78. She subsequently appeared frequently on television in guest roles, and appeared in the 1981 CBS TV remake of Jacqueline Susann's Valley of the Dolls, as Neely O'Hara. She was on WLS-TV's 1979 special "You're Never Too Old" recorded at Marriott's Great America in Gurnee, Illinois.

Hartman's breakthrough as an actress came in 1982 when she began appearing on the prime time drama Knots Landing, playing rock singer Ciji Dunne. Her character engaged in romances with the characters played by Ted Shackelford and Michael Sabatino. Hartman was popular with audiences, and when Ciji was murdered off-screen in 1983, there was a public uproar. As a solution, Hartman was brought back on the show as Cathy Geary, also a singer, who later marries an unbalanced televangelist played by a young Alec Baldwin. Hartman remained with the show until 1986, when she was released due to budget cuts and because the show's writers felt there were no further storylines for her character. During her time on the series, she appeared in the film Where the Boys Are '84 produced by Allan Carr. She also sang the film's theme song.

Hartman recorded four solo albums between 1976 and 1987 – two for Kirshner Records, one for RCA Records, and one for Atlantic Records. Her most notable song is "If Love Must Go", which she performed on various television shows like Solid Gold and The Merv Griffin Show. Despite additional contributions from successful songwriters and producers including Jeff Barry, Dobie Gray, Bryan Adams, Rick Springfield, Will Jennings, and Holly Knight, the albums were not commercially successful. She achieved her most notable success with a duet with her husband entitled "When I Said I Do". It reached Number 1 on the Billboard Hot Country Singles & Tracks charts on December 18, 1999, and was nominated for a Grammy Award. The duet was ranked No. 11 on CMT's 100 Greatest Duets in Country Music in 2005. They recorded a second duet titled "Easy For Me to Say", which peaked at No. 27 on the country music charts in 2002.

In the summer of 1994, Hartman co-hosted Universal Studios Summer Blast, a TV special celebrating the 30th anniversary of Universal Studios.

In April 2011, her albums Lisa Hartman, Hold On and Letterock were released on CD with bonus tracks by Wounded Bird Records under license from Sony. Her last album, 'Til My Heart Stops was reissued on CD in 2008 on Wounded Bird Records as well.

In May 2012, Hartman starred in Flicka: Country Pride, a movie from Twentieth Century Fox Home Entertainment. She plays the mother of a budding equestrian rider (Kacey Rohl).

In 2005, Hartman starred in a made-for-TV film, Back to You and Me, on the Hallmark Channel.

In 2020, she and husband Clint Black appeared on the fourth season of The Masked Singer as "Snow Owls", notably competing as the series' first duet competitors while riding in an egg-shaped vehicle.

Personal life
Hartman grew up in Houston, Texas. In 1991, she married musician Clint Black; and, in 2001, the couple had a daughter, Lily Pearl Black. They have lived in Nashville, Tennessee since 2002 after living in Laurel Canyon, Los Angeles, California.

Discography

Studio albums

Singles

Featured singles

Music videos

Filmography

Films

Television

Awards and nominations

References

External links
 
 
 

20th-century American actresses
21st-century American actresses
20th-century American singers
20th-century American women singers
Living people
American women country singers
American country singer-songwriters
American film actresses
American stage actresses
American television actresses
Lamar High School (Houston, Texas) alumni
Actresses from Houston
Musicians from Houston
Actresses from Nashville, Tennessee
Musicians from Nashville, Tennessee
Actresses from Los Angeles
Musicians from Los Angeles
Singer-songwriters from California
Singer-songwriters from Texas
Singer-songwriters from Tennessee
High School for the Performing and Visual Arts alumni
Country musicians from California
Country musicians from Texas
Country musicians from Tennessee
Best Musical or Comedy Actress Golden Globe (film) winners
Year of birth missing (living people)